Garmen is a village  in Blagoevgrad Province in Bulgaria and is the seat of Garmen Municipality. It is located in southwestern Bulgaria in the Western Rhodope Mountains in the Chech region 75 kilometers southeast of Blagoevgrad and 127 kilometers southeast of Sofia.

History 

In about 146 AD, after long battles between Roman troops and Thracians, the area around Gotse Delchev fell to Roman rule.  In 106 the emperor Trajan built the city Nicopolis ad Nestum in honor of the defeat. This town was destroyed at the end of the 6th century by the Slavs and the tribe of the Smolyani settled here.  The Slavs were farmers and herdsmen. They grew millet, wheat, flax, hemp and leguminous plants and they also bred birds, cattle, sheep and goats.

Garmen is mentioned several times in the Ottoman registers during the Ottoman rule and they also built a Turkish grange in the area where Nicopolis ad Nestum was located. Until the 19th century the municipality was mainly a farming area and a few men worked as builders in the interior of the country and in the Aegean region.  The first schools and churches were built in the area during the Bulgarian renaissance.  Garmen's church was named after St. George and was built in 1898 over the foundations of an older church. The church is an artistic monument of culture of national significance.  

During the Russo-Turkish war (1877–1878) and during the Balkan wars (1912–1913) the population in the municipality joined volunteer troops to fight. In 1901 a volunteer "militia" was formed by Stoyko Pashkulev.  The area was liberated from the Ottoman rule in 1912.

Climate
The municipality has a Mediterranean climate tempered by the high altitude.  It has one of the warmest climates in the country because it is between two climate zones-temperate continental and transitional Mediterranean. On an average year the precipitation is 620–780 mm/m² which is distributed relatively evenly between all four seasons. The air humidity ranges from 60% to 75% throughout the year. Snow cover is usually only for 70–100 days per year.

Health care and education

One GP doctor is working in Garmen and the nearest hospital is in Gotse Delchev.

There is one high school (I-XII grade) -  Stt. Kiril and Metodiy" Secondary school and a kindergarten. There is also a community center with a public library and different performing schools for music and dances.

Attractions

Garmen municipality includes the remains of the ancient town of Nikopolis ad Nestum which was created in 106 by the Roman emperor Taian in honor of his victory over the Daci tribe.  The name means "The city of the victory near Mesta".  This is thought to be one of the most important settlements that connects the Aegean coast with the Thracian Valley. The village of Garmen also contains a very old plane that was named first in Bulgaria for Tree of the Year 2011 and second in the European Tree of the Year contest for 2011. There is a private villa, offering accommodations for small groups.

Honour
Garmen Point on Smith Island, South Shetland Islands is named after Garmen.

References

Description of Garmen on en.journey.bg 
 Municipality of Garmen Guidebook, 2004
The Municipality of Garmen Guidebook, 2004

Villages in Blagoevgrad Province
Chech